S100 calcium-binding protein A16 (S100A16) is a protein that in humans is encoded by the S100A16 gene.

References

Further reading

S100 proteins